This is a list of diplomatic missions in the Philippines. The National Capital Region, more commonly known as Metro Manila, is host to 68 embassies. Several other countries have diplomatic missions accredited from other capitals.

Other major Philippine cities, namely Cebu and Davao, are also host to consular missions of neighboring Asian countries.

Honorary consulates are excluded from this listing.

Diplomatic missions in Manila

Embassies 
While all of these missions are referred to as Embassies in Manila, majority of their chanceries are physically in Makati and Taguig rather than Manila proper which hosts only four embassies.

Other missions or delegations

Gallery

Consular missions

Gallery

Non-resident embassies accredited to the Philippines 
Listed by city of residence.

Closed missions

See also 
 Foreign relations of the Philippines
 List of ambassadors to the Philippines
 List of diplomatic missions of the Philippines
 Visa requirements for Philippine citizens
 Visa policy of the Philippines

References

External links 
 Philippine Department of Foreign Affairs

Philippines
 
Diplomatic